Panchayat (Nepali: पञ्चायत) was a partyless political system in Nepal that was in place from 1961 to 1990. It placed all governmental power, including the Cabinet and Parliament, under one authority, the King, effectively making Nepal an absolute monarchy. In addition, political parties were declared illegal.

The Panchayat system was incepted by King Mahendra by side-lining the Nepali Congress government of B. P. Koirala on 15 December 1960 (1st Poush 2017 BS). He introduced the Panchayat system on 5 January 1961 (22nd Poush 2017 BS). Under his direct rule, King Mahendra introduced the four-tiered structure—village, town, district and national Panchayat—based on limited elected executive committees. Mahendra consolidated power by institutionalizing and invoking the three pillars of national identity—Hindu religion, Nepali language and monarchy—as a foundation of everyday social and religious life. Moreover, the system propagated the idea of Ek Raja, Ek Bhesh, Ek Bhasa, and Ek Desh (One King, One Dress, One Language, One Nation).

However, there was growing popular discontent over the panchayat system. In 1990, the illegal Nepali Congress and the United Left Front, a coalition of left-wing Nepali parties, joined together to start a campaign to restore multiparty democracy. The Nepalese Revolution began on 18 February 1990 and aimed to end Panchayat. King Birendra eventually announced that he would restore multiparty democracy, and the party ban was lifted on 8 April 1990, ending the panchayat system that had dominated Nepal for almost 30 years.

Background

In 1960, King Mahendra used his emergency powers. He took charge of the State's betterment once again, claiming that the Congress government had fostered corruption, promoted party above national interest, failed to maintain law and order and "encouraged anti-national elements". Political parties were outlawed, and all prominent political figures, including the Prime Minister, were put behind bars. Civil liberties were curtailed, and press freedom was muzzled. Then, through an "exercise of the sovereign power and prerogatives inherent in us," King Mahendra promulgated a new constitution in December 1959, introducing a party-less Panchayat system. This system was a "Guided democracy" in which the people could elect their representatives while real power remained in the hands of the monarch. Dissenters were called anti-national elements.

King Mahendra formulated the Panchayat System after overthrowing the first democratically elected government and dissolving the parliament in 1960. On 26 December 1961, King Mahendra appointed a council of five ministers to help run the administration. Several weeks later, political parties were declared illegal. At first, the Nepali Congress leadership propounded a non-violent struggle against the new order. It formed alliances with several political parties, including the Gorkha Parishad and the United Democratic Party. Early in 1961, however, the king set up a committee of four officials from the Central Secretariat to recommend changes in the constitution that would abolish political parties and substitute a "National Guidance" system based on local panchayat led directly by the king.

Adopted on the second anniversary of the dissolution of the government, the new constitution of December 16, 1962, created a four-tier panchayat system. At the local level, there were 4,000 village assemblies (gaun sabha) electing nine village panchayat members, who in turn elected a mayor (sabhapati). Each village panchayat sent a member to sit on one of 75 districts (zilla) panchayat, representing from 40 to 70 villages; the town panchayat chose one-third of the members of these assemblies. District panchayat members elected representatives to fourteen zone assemblies (anchal sabha), functioning as electoral colleges for the National Panchayat, or Rashtriya Panchayat, in Kathmandu. In addition, there were class organizations at village, district, and zonal levels for peasants, youth, women, elders, labourers, and ex-soldiers, who elected their representatives to assemblies. The National Panchayat of about 90 members could not criticize the royal government, debate the principles of party-less democracy, introduce budgetary bills without royal approval or enact bills without the king's approval. Mahendra was the supreme commander of the armed forces, appointed (and had the power to remove) members of the Supreme Court, appointed the Public Service Commission to oversee the civil service and could change any judicial decision or amend the constitution at any time. Within a span of ten years, the king had, in effect, reclaimed the sovereign power exercised by Prithvi Narayan Shah in the eighteenth century.

The first elections to the National Panchayat took place in March–April 1963. Although political parties were officially banned and the major opposition parties publicly refused to participate, about one-third of the legislature members were associated with the Nepali Congress. Support of the king by the army and the government bureaucracy prevented opposition to his rule from developing within the panchayat system. The real power came from the king's secretariat. In the countryside, influence rested in the offices of zonal commissioners and their official staff or the parallel system of development officers.

Founded on having a system "suitable to the soil" by King Mahendra, the Panchayat polity was marked by a party-less system emphasizing decentralization while class coordination was to be implemented "only through the active and dynamic leadership of the crown". Mahendra dismissed the first-ever democratically elected government of BP Koirala, and the Panchayat polity's legacy has had a lasting impact on Nepal's history. The Panchayat equated nationalism with the Nepali language, Daura-Suruwal and Hindu religion. It led to an aggressive campaign to mould a Nepali identity along these lines. However, the institutions and policies of Panchayat were riddled with contradictions.

Reforms during Panchayat Regime
Under the direct leadership of the king, the government implemented some of the significant projects initiated under the previous regime and oversaw further steps toward the country's development. Land reforms led to the confiscation of large Rana estates. Rajya reform abolished the special privileges of some aristocratic elites in western Nepal. A new legal code promulgated in 1963 replaced the Muluki Ain of 1854. A major land reform program launched in 1964 essentially was a failure. The new panchayat system managed to bring 50,000 to 60,000 people into a single system of representative government in a way that had been rendered impossible for the elite-based political parties. Nepal was able to carry out its second plan (1962–65) and third plan (1965-70) and to begin the Fourth Five-Year Plan (1970–75). Eradication of malaria, construction of the Mahendra Highway, or East-West Highway, along the southern foot of the hills, and land settlement programs contributed to a massive population movement from the mountains into the Terai, resulting in a significant increase in the area devoted to agriculture.

Due to these economic reforms, by 1986, 2,054 industrial establishments were employing about 125,000 workers nationwide.

Amendments to the 1962 Panchayat Constitution
Back to the Village National Campaign (2023 B.S.), the first amendment to the 1962 Constitution was one of the significant rural development efforts of the Panchayat system to be launched in 1967. Later Politics for Development was another amendment to develop Nepal during the Panchayat Era (26 Mangsir, 2032 B.S.), making the "Back to Village National Campaign" a constitutional organ.

End of Panchayat Regime
There was resentment against the authoritarian regime and the curbs on the freedom of the political parties. There was a widespread feeling of the Palace being non-representative of the masses, especially when the Marich Man Singh government faced political scandals on charges of misappropriation of funds allotted for the victims of the earthquake in August 1988 or when it reshuffled the Cabinet instead of investigating the deaths of the people in a stampede in the national sports complex in a hailstorm. Also, the souring of the India-Nepal trade relations affected the popularity of the Singh government.

In April 1987, Nepal introduced the work permit for Indian workers in three districts. In early 1989, Nepal provided a 40% duty concession to Chinese goods and later withdrew duty concessions from Indian goods so that Chinese goods became cheaper than Indian goods. This led to the souring of relations already strained over Nepal's purchase of Chinese arms in 1988. India refused to renew two separate Treaties of Trade and Transit and insisted on a single treaty dealing with the two issues, which was unacceptable to Nepal. A deadlock ensued, and the Treaties of Trade and Transit expired on March 23, 1989. The lower classes in Nepal mainly faced the brunt of the closure of the trade and transit points due to the restricted supply of consumer goods and petroleum products like petrol, aviation fuel and kerosene. The industries suffered because they depended on India for resources, trade and transit. The Government of Nepal tried to deal with the situation by relying on foreign aid from the US, UK, Australia and China. However, the government's strategy to manage the crisis could not satisfy those people who desired negotiations with India rather than dependence on foreign aid as a solution.

Taking advantage of the uneasiness among some people against the government and the strained India-Nepal relations, the Nepali Congress (NC) and the left-wing parties blamed the government for perpetuating the crisis and not taking any serious measures to solve it. In December 1989, the NC tried to utilize B.P. Koirala's anniversary by launching a people's awareness program. The left-wing alliance known as the United Left Front (ULF) extended its support to the NC in its campaign for a party system. On January 18–19, 1990, the NC held a conference to which leaders from various countries and foreign press members were invited. Leaders from India attended the meeting; Germany, Japan, Spain, and Finland supported the movement, and the US and West Germany embassies were present on occasion. Inspired by the international support and the democratic movements occurring throughout the world after the disintegration of the Soviet Union in 1989, the NC and the ULF launched a mass movement on February 18 to end the Panchayat regime and the installation of an interim government represented by various parties and people.

On April 6, the Marich Man Singh government was dismissed, and Lokendra Bahadur Chand became the Prime Minister on the same day. However, the agitating mob was not satisfied with the change of government as they were not against the Singh government per se but against the party-less system. The people became violent, and a few people were killed in an encounter with the Army. On April 16, the Chand government was also dismissed. A Royal Proclamation was issued the next day, which dissolved the National Panchayat, the Panchayat policy, the evaluation committee, and the class organizations. Instead, the proclamation declared the "functioning of the political parties". It maintained that "all political parties will always keep the national interest uppermost in organizing themselves according to their political ideology."

References 

Politics of Nepal